Adam Fellner (born 10 August 1993) is a Czech cross-country skier who competes internationally.

He represented his country at the 2022 Winter Olympics.

Cross-country skiing results
All results are sourced from the International Ski Federation (FIS).

Olympic Games

Distance reduced to 30 km due to weather conditions.

World Championships

World Cup

Season standings

References

External links

Czech male cross-country skiers
1993 births
Living people
Olympic cross-country skiers of the Czech Republic
Cross-country skiers at the 2022 Winter Olympics
People from Jeseník
Sportspeople from the Olomouc Region